is a Japanese football player currently playing for Zweigen Kanazawa.

Career statistics
Updated to end of 2018 season.

References

External links
Profile at Zweigen Kanazawa
Kyohei Sugiura on Instagram 

Kawasaki Frontale profile 

1989 births
Living people
Association football people from Shizuoka Prefecture
Japanese footballers
J1 League players
J2 League players
Kawasaki Frontale players
Ehime FC players
Vissel Kobe players
Vegalta Sendai players
Zweigen Kanazawa players
Association football midfielders